Worcester was a 48-gun third rate frigate built for the navy of the Commonwealth of England at Woolwich Dockyard, and launched in 1651.

After the Restoration in 1660, it was renamed HMS Dunkirk. By 1677 her armament had been increased to 60 guns. In 1704 it underwent a rebuild at Blackwall Yard, relaunching as a 60-gun fourth rate ship of the line. On 12 September 1729 Dunkirk was ordered to be taken to pieces at Portsmouth, and rebuilt by Joseph Allin the younger as a 60-gun fourth rate to the 1719 Establishment. It was relaunched on 3 September 1734.

Dunkirk was broken up in 1749.

Notes

References

Lavery, Brian (2003) The Ship of the Line - Volume 1: The development of the battlefleet 1650–1850. Conway Maritime Press. .

Ships of the line of the Royal Navy
Ships built in Woolwich
1650s ships
Ships built by the Blackwall Yard